Titanium(III) chloride is the inorganic compound with the formula TiCl3. At least four distinct species have this formula; additionally hydrated derivatives are known. TiCl3 is one of the most common halides of titanium and is an important catalyst for the manufacture of polyolefins.

Structure and bonding
In TiCl3, each titanium atom has one d electron, rendering its derivatives paramagnetic, that is, the substance is attracted into a magnetic field. Solutions of titanium(III) chloride are violet, which arises from excitations of its d-electron. The colour is not very intense since the transition is forbidden by the Laporte selection rule.

Four solid forms or polymorphs of TiCl3 are known. All feature titanium in an octahedral coordination sphere. These forms can be distinguished by crystallography as well as by their magnetic properties, which probes exchange interactions. β-TiCl3 crystallizes as brown needles. Its structure consists of chains of TiCl6 octahedra that share opposite faces such that the closest Ti–Ti contact is 2.91 Å. This short distance indicates strong metal–metal interactions (see figure in upper right). The three violet "layered" forms, named for their color and their tendency to flake, are called alpha (α), gamma (γ), and delta (δ). In α-TiCl3, the chloride anions are hexagonal close-packed. In γ-TiCl3, the chlorides anions are cubic close-packed. Finally, disorder in shift successions, causes an intermediate between alpha and gamma structures, called the δ form. The TiCl6 share edges in each form, with 3.60 Å being the shortest distance between the titanium cations. This large distance between titanium cations precludes direct metal-metal bonding. In contrast, the trihalides of the heavier metals hafnium and zirconium engage in metal-metal bonding. Direct Zr–Zr bonding is indicated in zirconium(III) chloride. The difference between the Zr(III) and Ti(III) materials is attributed in part to the relative radii of these metal centers.

Synthesis and reactivity
TiCl3 is produced usually by reduction of titanium(IV) chloride.  Older reduction methods used hydrogen:
2 TiCl4  +  H2   →  2 HCl  +  2 TiCl3
It can also be produced by the reaction of titanium metal and hydrochloric acid.

It is conveniently reduced with aluminium and sold as a mixture with aluminium trichloride, TiCl3·AlCl3. This mixture can be separated to afford TiCl3(THF)3. The complex adopts a meridional structure. This light-blue complex TiCl3(THF)3 forms when TiCl3 is treated with tetrahydrofuran (THF).
TiCl3 + 3 C4H8O → TiCl3(OC4H8)3
An analogous dark green complex arises from complexation with dimethylamine. In a reaction where all ligands are exchanged, TiCl3 is a precursor to the blue-colored complex Ti(acac)3.

The more reduced titanium(II) chloride is prepared by the thermal disproportionation of TiCl3 at 500 °C. The reaction is driven by the loss of volatile TiCl4:
2 TiCl3 → TiCl2 + TiCl4

The ternary halides, such as A3TiCl6, have structures that depend on the cation (A+) added. Caesium chloride treated with titanium(II) chloride and hexachlorobenzene produces crystalline CsTi2Cl7. In these structures Ti3+ exhibits octahedral coordination geometry.

Applications
TiCl3 is the main Ziegler–Natta catalyst, responsible for most industrial production of polyethylene. The catalytic activities depend strongly on the polymorph of the TiCl3 (α vs. β vs. γ vs. δ) and the method of preparation.

Laboratory use
TiCl3 is also a specialized reagent in organic synthesis, useful for reductive coupling reactions, often in the presence of added reducing agents such as zinc. It reduces oximes to imines. Titanium trichloride can reduce nitrate to ammonium ion thereby allowing for the sequential analysis of nitrate and ammonia.  Slow deterioration occurs in air-exposed titanium trichloride, often resulting in erratic results, such as in reductive coupling reactions.

Safety
TiCl3 and most of its complexes are typically handled under air-free conditions to prevent reactions with oxygen and moisture.  Samples of TiCl3 can be relatively air stable or pyrophoric.

References

Titanium(III) compounds
Chlorides
Titanium halides
Reducing agents